Pavlovice u Přerova is a municipality and village in Přerov District in the Olomouc Region of the Czech Republic. It has about 700 inhabitants.

History
The first written mention of Pavlovice u Přerova is from 1349.

References

Villages in Přerov District